Désiré Bastin (4 March 1900 – 18 April 1971) was a Belgian association football player who competed in the 1920 Summer Olympics. He was a member of the Belgium team, which won the gold medal in the football tournament.

References

External links
 Désiré Bastin's profile at databaseOlympics
 
 

1900 births
1971 deaths
Footballers from Antwerp
Belgian footballers
Footballers at the 1920 Summer Olympics
Footballers at the 1924 Summer Olympics
Olympic footballers of Belgium
Olympic gold medalists for Belgium
Belgium international footballers
Olympic medalists in football
Medalists at the 1920 Summer Olympics
Association football midfielders
20th-century Belgian people